Ferocactus flavovirens is a species of Ferocactus from Mexico.

References

External links
 
 

flavovirens
Flora of Mexico
Plants described in 1841